Dance Research is a twice-yearly academic journal founded in 1982. It is published by Edinburgh University Press on behalf of the Society for Dance Research in Spring and Autumn each year. Each issue contains articles, as well as book reviews and review essays.

External links 

 

Edinburgh University Press academic journals
Publications established in 1983
Arts journals
English-language journals
Biannual journals